Matěj Pulkrab (born 23 May 1997) is a Czech professional footballer who plays as a forward for SV Sandhausen.

Club career

Sparta Prague
Pulkrab is an academy graduate of Sparta Prague and captained the club at U-19 level. In 2015, he was named "Player of the Tournament" in the CEE Cup.

Loan to Slovan Liberec
On 13 January 2016 Pulkrab completed a loan move to Slovan Liberec from parent club Sparta Prague in a deal that saw Josef Šural complete a permanent move in the opposite direction. He made his debut for the club on 12 March, coming on as a 92nd-minute substitute for Marek Bakoš in a 1–0 win over Příbram. Pulkrab scored four goals in the final three games of the season, including one on the final day which earned Liberec a third-place finish in the Czech First League.

Return to Sparta Prague
Pulkrab returned to Sparta Prague for the 2016–17 season and made his debut on 18 August, coming off the bench in a 0–0 Europa League draw with SønderjyskE. He scored his first goal for the club three days later, netting his team's second in a 3–0 Czech Liga win over Jablonec. He made his Cup debut on 12 October and scored in a 2-1 win over České Budějovice. On 20 October, Pulkrab scored his first ever European goal, scoring the only goal of the match in a 1–0 Europa League win over Hapoel Be'er Sheva. He ultimately made 24 appearances for the season, and scored seven goals across all competitions.

Second loan to Slovan Liberec
On 3 July 2017, Pulkrab returned to Slovan Liberec on a season-long loan. He made his second debut for the club on 30 July and marked the occasion by scoring the only goal in a 1–0 win over Zlín. Having not scored again since his opening goal, Pulkrab scored seven goals in five matches across February and March 2018. Included in the run was his fifteenth career goal in the Czech First League; a milestone he reached faster than any other player in the competition, including international counterparts, Milan Baroš and Václav Kadlec. He ultimately scored 10 goals for the season before returning to Sparta Prague upon the expiration of his loan.

Second return to Sparta Prague
Following his loan spell, Pulkrab once again returned to Sparta and played a prominent role during the 2018–19 campaign, where he scored four goals in 18 appearances before being sidelined by an Achilles tendon injury in March 2019.

Personal life
Outside of football, Pulkrab is an avid guitar player and admitted to being self-taught. During his time with Slovan Liberec, he would often play the instrument with teammate Zdeněk Folprecht.

Career statistics

Club

References

External links 
 Matěj Pulkrab at Sparta Prague
 

1997 births
Living people
Czech footballers
Czech Republic youth international footballers
Association football forwards
FC Slovan Liberec players
AC Sparta Prague players
Bohemians 1905 players
Czech First League players
Footballers from Prague
Czech Republic under-21 international footballers
SV Sandhausen players
Expatriate footballers in Germany
Czech expatriate sportspeople in Germany
2. Bundesliga players